NRH may refer to:

 Nodular regenerative hyperplasia, a liver condition
 North Richland Hills, Texas, U.S.
 MedStar National Rehabilitation Hospital, Washington, DC, U.S.
 Nutritional Rehabilitation Homes of the Nepal Youth Foundation
 nrh (trigraph), romanization for Hmong  
 Newark Renaissance House, New Jersey, US drug rehabilitation center

See also
 NRHS (disambiguation)